Saint-Florent is a commune in Haute-Corse department on the island of Corsica, France. Originally a fishing port located in the gulf of the same name, pleasure boats have now largely taken the place of fishing vessels.

Today, it is a popular summer vacation spot for many tourists because of its proximity to the Patrimonio vineyards and the Saleccia beach.

History
Saint-Florent was created by the Genoese in the 16th century as a base to carry out repressive operations against the Corsican patriots in the surrounding villages. France later used it to disembark hordes of mercenaries and colonists during August 1764 in order to subject the independent Corsican people. After the defeat at Ponte Novu Bridge, the army of Pasquale Paoli, sometimes called "the Father of Corsica", with the aid of the fleet of Horatio Nelson, reconquered Saint-Florent in 1794 during Corsiaca<s brief Anglo-Corsican rule.

Population

Climate

Sights
 
The monuments of Saint-Florent are the Genoese citadel constructed in 1440 at the same time as the city, and the Romanesque Saint-Florent Cathedral, or the cathedral of the Nebbio, now the church of Santa Maria Assunta.

Near the village are the Genoese towers Torra di Mortella and Torra di Fornali.

Notable people
Louis Bizarelli, former politician, was born at Saint-Florent in 1836.
Lizzy Mercier Descloux, musician and singer, spent her last years in Saint-Florent. She died there in 2004.
Marie Ferranti, author, lives and works in Saint-Florent.
Antoine Gentili, general and exile companion of Pasquale Paoli.

See also
Communes of the Haute-Corse department

References

External links
 
 Picture of Saint-Florent Cathedral

Communes of Haute-Corse
Haute-Corse communes articles needing translation from French Wikipedia